Charles Providence Gomis (5 February 1941 – 16 July 2021) was a diplomat from the Ivory Coast. He was briefly Minister of Foreign Affairs from March 2000 until October 2000.

Early life 
Gomis was born in Ivory Coast, French West Africa. He graduated from the University of California, Los Angeles, and Johns Hopkins University in the United States.

Career 
In 2000, Gomis was the Minister for Foreign Affairs of the Ivory Coast. He was a delegate to the Millennium Summit.

From 2002 to 2006, Gomis served as the Head of Political Affairs of the United Nations Mission in the Democratic Republic of Congo.

From 2006 to 2007, Gomis served as the Head of Office of the United Nations Mission in the Democratic Republic of Congo.

Gomis served as the Ivory Coast's Ambassador to the United States, the Bahamas, Mexico, Brazil, Colombia, and France.

See also 
Sidi Tiémoko Touré, current Minister of Animal and Fisheries Resources

References

Further reading

External links 
 Charles Gomis at C-SPAN

1941 births
2021 deaths
Foreign Ministers of Ivory Coast
Ambassadors of Ivory Coast to Colombia
Ambassadors of Ivory Coast to France
Ambassadors of Ivory Coast to the United States
Ambassadors of Ivory Coast to Brazil
Ivorian diplomats
Knights of the Ordre national du Mérite
University of California, Los Angeles alumni
Johns Hopkins University alumni
People from Grand-Bassam
Ambassadors of Ivory Coast to Mexico
Ambassadors of Ivory Coast to the Bahamas